This glossary of chess problems explains commonly used terms in chess problems, in alphabetical order. For a list of unorthodox pieces used in chess problems, see Fairy chess piece; for a list of terms used in chess is general, see Glossary of chess; for a list of chess-related games, see List of chess variants.

A

B

C

D

E

F

G

H

I

K

L

M

N

O

P

R

S

T

U

V

W

Z

Notes

References

External links
 Problemesis contains a glossary and list of themes

 
Problems
Wikipedia glossaries using description lists